m-Xylylenediamine is an organic compound with the formula C6H4(CH2NH2)2. A colorless oily liquid, it is produced by hydrogenation of isophthalonitrile.

Uses and reactions
m-Xylylenediamine (MXDA) is used in a variety of industrial applications including amine based curing agents for epoxy resins which may then be formulated into coatings, adhesives, sealants, and elastomers.

m-Xylylenediamine undergoes to Sommelet reaction to give isophthalaldehyde.

Hazards
Exposure to m-xylylenediamine may occur by inhalation, skin contact, eye exposure, or ingestion. It can cause chemical burns, tissue damage, delayed pulmonary edema, shock, and skin sensitization. Symptoms of inhalation include a burning sensation in the respiratory tract, cough, sore throat, labored breathing, and dyspnea (shortness of breath). It is also flammable and produces toxic fumes when burned. m-Xylylenediamine reacts with acids, acid chlorides, and acid anhydrides.

References

External links 
  Safety Data Sheet
  Product Data

diamines